Avize is a commune in the Marne department in northeastern France.

Champagne
The village's vineyards are located in the Côte des Blancs subregion of Champagne, and are classified as Grand Cru (100%) in the Champagne vineyard classification.

Located in the heart of the Côte des Blancs, Avize is a village wine with  many  Champagne houses. About 400 winegrowers  harvest 3,350 tons of  grapes annually. Its fermentation within the 12 km of the city cellars gave birth to the most prestigious wines of Champagne: Blanc de blancs. A treasure with  flavors of orange and grapefruit that attracted the most beautiful houses in Avize: Moët & Chandon, Veuve Clicquot and Champagne Roederer. Major champagne houses were founded in Avize as De Cazanove (1811), Koch (1820), or Bricout (1966).

Population

See also
Communes of the Marne department
Classification of Champagne vineyards

References

External links

Champagne Charles Koch history

Communes of Marne (department)
Grand Cru Champagne villages